Lärje-Angereds IF is a Swedish football club located in Angered, a suburb in Gothenburg Municipality.

Background
Since their foundation, Lärje-Angereds IF has participated mainly in the middle and lower divisions of the Swedish football league system. The club currently plays in Division 2 Västra Götaland which is the fourth tier of Swedish football. The club spent 3 seasons in Division 2 Västra Götaland from 2006 to 2008, but after two consecutive relegations dropped to Division 4 Göteborg A for the 2010 season. With much improved form in 2010, LAIF won their Division 4 section to clinch promotion back to Division 3. They play their home matches at the Bläsebovallen in Angered.

Lärje-Angereds IF are affiliated to Göteborgs Fotbollförbund.

Youth Development
Larje-Angereds IF have a successful youth development programme which has been reflected by the recent emergence of two talented young players. Amin Affane agreed to join Chelsea FC in January 2010, leaving Lärje-Angereds IF to head to London ahead of interest from some of Europe's biggest teams. The 17-year-old left-footed attacking midfielder has represented Sweden at Under-16 level.

Another Larje-Angereds IF youngster Anjur Osmanović revealed in February 2011 that he has also left the club to join Chelsea FC. The 16-year-old midfielder has Bosnian roots. Anjur Osmanovic told Swedish daily newspaper, Aftonbladet, that he had a lot of offers from England but in the end chose Chelsea in order to continue his development. He is reported to have signed a three-year contract.

Season to season

Attendances

In recent seasons Lärje-Angereds IF have had the following average attendances:

Footnotes

External links
 Lärje-Angereds IF – Official website
 Lärje-Angereds IF P-94-95 – Youth team
 Lärje-Angereds IF on Facebook

Football clubs in Gothenburg
Football clubs in Västra Götaland County